XHCJ-FM 94.3/XECJ-AM 970 is a combo radio station in Apatzingán, Michoacán, Mexico. It is owned by Grupo Radio Apatzingán, a subsidiary of Cadena RASA, and is branded as La Ke Buena.

History
XECJ received its concession on July 21, 1952 and signed on October 18 of that year. The station initially broadcast on 1340 kHz and soon relocated to 970; it has been held by the same concessionaire since signing on.

It became an AM-FM combo in 1994.

On January 1, 2021, XECJ-XHCJ dropped the Los 40 pop format from Radiópolis and became known as "La CJ" with a flip to adult hits. On May 1, it changed again to simulcast RASA pop station XHLY-FM "2021 FM" in Morelia. In February 2022, the station returns to a concept of Radiópolis, now as La Ke Buena.

References

Radio stations in Michoacán
Radio stations established in 1952
1952 establishments in Mexico